The KNVB Amateur Cup was the cup competition for amateur football clubs in the Netherlands. The winner qualified until 2016 for the amateur super cup match against the national Hoofdklasse champion.

The cup was contested by the winners of the district cups in the six districts of the Royal Dutch Football Association: West 1, West 2, South 1, South 2, East and North. The six teams faced each other in a knock-out competition, starting in the quarter-finals. Two clubs received a bye, but they had to play an away game in the semi-finals.

The KNVB Amateur Cup was first contested in the 1980-81 season, replacing the KNVB Saturday Amateur Cup and KNVB Sunday Amateur Cup (see Hoofdklasse#Background for more on Saturday and Sunday football in the Netherlands).

The structure of the cup competition has changed throughout the years. For a number of years, the clubs were placed in two pools of three teams each. Matches were played in two halves of 20 or 30 minutes each, with all group matches played on a single day. The final was held on another day, and was played in two halves of 45 minutes. Between 1996-97 and 2000–01, nine clubs took part, because the Royal Dutch Football Association then consisted of nine districts. Until 1997, the reserve teams of professional football clubs took part in the district cup competitions; two of them won the KNVB Amateur Cup: Ajax Reserves in 1983-84 and SC Heerenveen Reserves in 1990-91. From the 1997-98 season onwards, the reserve teams play in the KNVB Reserve Cup. 

The KNVB decided, in consultation with the clubs, that the final round between the six district cup winners for the Amateur Cup came to an end after the 2015–16 season.

Past winners

See also
KNVB Cup
FA Vase
FA Trophy
Football in the Netherlands

Reference

KNVB Cup
Recurring sporting events established in 1980
Recurring sporting events disestablished in 2016
National association football cups
Defunct football competitions in the Netherlands